Francis J. Dunn was a Wisconsin politician.

Dunn was appointed secretary of the Wisconsin Territory by President Martin Van Buren on January 25, 1841. He continued in office until Alexander P. Field took office on April 23, 1841. Dunn served in the Wisconsin Territorial House of Representatives from Lafayette County in 1841.

Francis Dunn was born and raised in Miami, Florida.

Notes

People from Lafayette County, Wisconsin
Members of the Wisconsin Territorial Legislature
19th-century American politicians
Secretaries of State of Wisconsin
Year of birth missing
Year of death missing
Wisconsin lawyers